Stelis pompalis is a species of orchid plant native to Costa Rica.

References 

pompalis
Flora of Costa Rica